The simple station Calle 142 is part of the TransMilenio mass-transit system of Bogotá, Colombia, which opened in 2000.

Location

The station is located in northern Bogotá, specifically on Autopista Norte with Calle 144.

It serves the Los Cedros and Prado Pinzón neighborhoods.

History

After the opening of the Portal de Usme in early 2001, the Autopista Norte line was opened. This station was added as a northerly expansion of that line, which was completed with the opening of the Portal del Norte later that year.

The station is named Calle 142 due to its location near that road, though it serves the Cedritos area.

On March 7, 2011, an articulated bus crashed into one of their wagons. Ten people were injured and the station suffered damage.

Station services

Old trunk services

Main line service

Feeder routes

This station does not have connections to feeder routes.

Inter-city service

This station does not have inter-city service.

External links
TransMilenio

See also
Bogotá
TransMilenio
List of TransMilenio Stations

TransMilenio